Ogna may refer to:

Places
Ogna, a village in Hå municipality in Rogaland county, Norway
Ogna (municipality), a former municipality in Rogaland county, Norway
Ogna Church, a church in Hå municipality in Rogaland county, Norway
Ogna Station, a railway station in Hå municipality in Rogaland county, Norway
Ogna (river), a river in Steinkjer municipality in Trøndelag county, Norway
Ogna or Oghna, a village in Jhadol tehsil, Udaipur district, Rajasthan, India

People with the surname
Giuseppe Ogna (1933–2010), Italian cyclist

See also
Villa d'Ogna, a municipality in Bergamo province, Lombardy, Italy